Mauritius participated in the 2010 Summer Youth Olympics in Singapore.

The Mauritius team consisted of 9 athletes competing in 5 sports: athletics, badminton, judo, swimming and table tennis.

Medalists

Athletics

Boys
Track and Road Events

Field Events

Badminton

Girls

Judo

Individual

Team

Swimming

Table tennis

Individual

Team

References

External links
Competitors List: Mauritius

You
Nations at the 2010 Summer Youth Olympics
Mauritius at the Youth Olympics